Orrick Township is an inactive township in Ray County, in the U.S. state of Missouri. It is part of the Kansas City metropolitan area.

History
Orrick Township was founded in 1886, taking its name from the town of Orrick, Missouri.

References

Townships in Ray County, Missouri
Townships in Missouri